The Edestidae are a poorly known, extinct family of shark-like eugeneodontid holocephalid cartilaginous fish.  Similar to the related family Helicoprionidae, members of this family possessed a unique "tooth-whorl" on the symphysis of the lower jaw and pectoral fins supported by long radials.  In addition to having a tooth-whorl on the lower jaw, at least one species of the genus Edestus had a second tooth-whorl in the upper jaw.  The palatoquadrate was either fused to the skull or reduced.  Edestids, along with the rest of the Eugeneodontida, are placed within the Holocephali. The family disappeared in the Early Triassic.

References

External links
Palaeos Vertebrates 70.100 Chondrichthyes: Eugnathostomata Paleos.com at paleos.com
JSTOR: Journal of PaleontologyVol. 70, No. 1 (Jan., 1996), pp. 162-165
Mikkk's phylogeny Archive

 
Mississippian first appearances
Early Jurassic extinctions